Marek Vašut (born 5 May 1960 in Prague, Czechoslovakia) is a Czech film, stage, and television actor, best known for his appearances in Solomon Kane and Blade II. He voiced the character Tommy Angelo for the Czech version of the video game Mafia: The City of Lost Heaven. Vašut later reprised his role as Tommy in the 2020 remake Mafia: Definitive Edition.

Education
Vašut had first travelled to New York City to attend the Lee Strasberg Theatre and Film Institute. Vašut also attended and the Academy of Performing Arts in Prague.

Filmography

References

External links

1960 births
Living people
Male actors from Prague
Czech male film actors
Lee Strasberg Theatre and Film Institute alumni
Czech male video game actors
Czech expatriates in the United States
Academy of Performing Arts in Prague alumni